The call to the bar is a legal term of art in most common law jurisdictions where persons must be qualified to be allowed to argue in court on behalf of another party and are then said to have been "called to the bar" or to have received "call to the bar". "The bar" is now used as a collective noun for barristers, but literally referred to the wooden barrier in old courtrooms, which separated the often crowded public area at the rear from the space near the judges reserved for those having business with the court. Barristers would sit or stand immediately behind it, facing the judge, and could use it as a table for their briefs.

Like many other common law terms, the term originated in England in the Middle Ages, and the call to the bar refers to the summons issued to one found fit to speak at the "bar" of the royal courts. In time, English judges allowed only legally qualified men to address them on the law and later delegated the qualification and admission of barristers to the four Inns of Court. Once an inn calls one of its members to its bar, they are thereafter a barrister. They may not, however, practise as a barrister until they have completed (or been exempted from) an apprenticeship called pupillage. After completing pupillage, they are considered to be a practising barrister with a right of audience before all courts.

England and Wales and some other jurisdictions distinguish two types of lawyers, who are regulated by different bodies, with separate training, examinations, regulation and traditions:
 Barristers primarily practise in court and generally specialise in advocacy in a particular field of law; they have a right of audience in all courts of England and Wales. 
 Solicitors do not necessarily undertake court work, but have a right of audience in the lower courts (magistrates' courts and county courts). They are admitted or enrolled as a solicitor, to conduct litigation and practise in law outside court, e.g., providing legal advice to lay clients and acting on their behalf in legal matters.

A solicitor must qualify as a solicitor-advocate in order to acquire the same "higher rights" of audience as a barrister. In other jurisdictions, the terminology and the degree of overlap between the roles of solicitor and barrister varies greatly; in most, the distinction has disappeared entirely.

Particular jurisdictions
Common law jurisdictions include Australia, England and Wales, New Zealand, Canada, Hong Kong, India, Nigeria, the Republic of Ireland, Northern Ireland and most jurisdictions in the Commonwealth of Nations and the United States (the See also section below contains links to articles on the laws of these jurisdictions).

Australia
In Australia, the status of the legal profession differs from state to state:

 Queensland and New South Wales formally split the legal profession between solicitors and barristers;
 South Australia, Victoria, Western Australia and the Australian Capital Territory have "fused" the professions of barrister and solicitor, but each state maintains an independent bar for lawyers who solely practice as barristers; and
 Tasmania and the Northern Territory have fused professions, with a very small number of legal practitioners operating as an independent bar.

Most Australian barristers will have previously worked as solicitors prior to becoming barristers.

Candidates wishing to become barristers may have to pass an examination and undergo further specialised training before those candidates are "called to the bar" or "sign the roll of counsel". Both the examination and the further training are administered by the state's bar association:

 in Queensland, candidates must pass "three 1.5 hour examinations, focusing on legal ethics, practice and procedure, and evidence", and then successfully complete the Bar Practice Course;
 in New South Wales, candidates must pass the NSW Bar Examination, and then successfully complete the Bar Practice Course; and
 in Victoria, candidates must pass the Victorian Bar Entrance Exam, and then successfully complete the Victorian Bar Readers' Course.

Upon completing the relevant training course, new barristers ("readers") are required to spend a period of months "reading" in the chambers of an experienced barrister, called the reader's "tutor" (in New South Wales) or "mentor" (in Victoria) (historically, this experienced barrister was called the new barrister's "pupil master"). This "reading" period serves as a kind of practical apprenticeship for the new barrister, who works in the same chambers as their tutor/mentor and is able to learn by observing their tutor/mentor, as well as actively seeking their guidance.

Canada
 
In common law Canadian provinces, despite the unified legal profession (lawyers are qualified as both barristers and solicitors), the certificate issued by the provincial Law Society to the newly qualified lawyer generally indicates his or her having been called to the bar and admitted as a solicitor. 

In Ontario and Manitoba, there are two certificates, one issued by the respective provincial Law Society for call to the bar and the other by the Superior Court (Ontario) or Court of Queen's Bench (Manitoba) for admission as a solicitor. 

In Ontario, being called to the bar requires students to article (apprentice) with a law firm for ten months, but due to a shortage of articling positions available each year and an influx of articling candidates, a pilot alternative program available through the University of Ottawa and Toronto Metropolitan University was established. The Law Practice Program requires the articling students to spend four months in a virtual law office and to spend another four months in a work placement.   

Alberta and Prince Edward Island are the only common law jurisdictions with individual, rather than group, calls. The student's supervisor, referred to as his or her principal, makes an oral application to the Provincial Court of Alberta or Court of Queen's Bench, or the Supreme Court of Prince Edward Island, respectively, to have the student called to the bar. Gowns are worn and the ceremony is public, with the presiding judge (or judges) welcoming the new member with a speech written specifically for that call. 

In Quebec, a civil law notary is very similar to a solicitor.

England and Wales
In England and Wales, a call ceremony takes place at the barrister's Inn of Court (or at Temple Church for members of the Inner Temple), before or during the pupillage year. A barrister is called to the utter ("outer") bar or "appointed to the degree of the utter bar". Those appointed as King's Counsel are entitled to plead from "within the bar" in court.

Ireland
In Ireland, the legal profession is split between solicitors and barristers. Candidates wishing to qualify as barristers must complete a series of examinations at the Honorable Society of King's Inns. Successful candidates are called to the Bar by the Chief Justice in the Supreme Court. Upon being called to the bar, a barrister becomes a member of the Outer Bar, or "Junior Counsel". Some barristers may subsequently be called to the Inner Bar in a similar ceremony, gaining the title "Senior Counsel".

New Zealand
As in Canada, the legal profession is fused. A lawyer in New Zealand is admitted as either a "barrister sole" or a "barrister and solicitor of the High Court of New Zealand". Once admitted, New Zealand's "barrister and solicitors" are able to practise in either mode provided they hold a practising certificate, while barristers sole are entitled only to practice as a barrister. Admission is overseen by the New Zealand Law Society.

Nigeria
As in New Zealand, there is no formal distinction between barristers and solicitors. A lawyer in Nigeria is admitted as a "Barrister and Solicitor of the Supreme Court of Nigeria". Once admitted, Nigerian lawyers may argue in any federal trial or appellate court as well as any of the courts in Nigeria's thirty six states and the Federal Capital Territory. Lawyers are regulated by the Nigerian Bar Association.

Northern Ireland
Prior to the partition of Ireland, barristers in what is now Northern Ireland were called to the bar in the same manner as those in the rest of Ireland. The procedure remains much the same today, save that candidates wishing to qualify as barristers must complete a series of examinations at the Institute of Professional Legal Studies at Queen's University Belfast (under the supervision of the Honourable Society of the Inn of Court of Northern Ireland), barristers are called to the bar by the Lord Chief Justice of Northern Ireland and members of the Inner Bar are known as Queen's Counsel.

Sri Lanka
In Sri Lanka, a lawyer must be admitted and enrolled as an attorney-at-law of the Supreme Court of Sri Lanka. This is referred to as the call to the bar.

United States
Generally, a lawyer is said to have been "admitted to the bar" and become an "attorney at law"; some states still use the older term "attorney and counselor (also spelled 'counsellor') at law", upon taking his or her oath of office. Historically, the institution of attorney was similar to that of the solicitor, whereas the office of the counselor was almost identical to that of the barrister, but today this distinction has disappeared. The phrase "called to the bar" is still sometimes used informally by U.S. attorneys to refer to their qualification as a lawyer.

See also 
 Admission to the bar
 Bar (law)
 Bar association
 Bar council
 Election to the Faculty of Advocates, Scotland
 Law of Australia
 Law of Canada
 Law of England and Wales
 Law of Hong Kong
 Law of India
 Law of New Zealand
 Law of Northern Ireland
 Law of the Republic of Ireland
 Politics of Nigeria

References

Judiciaries
Common law
English law
Professional certification in law